Cape Lithinon or Cape Lithino, Crete, Greece is a promontory at the southernmost point of the island of Crete, south of Matala and west of Kaloi Limenes.  It marks the southeastern limit of the Bay of Mesara.  The promontory rises to about 390 m (Mt. Kefali) and drops off precipitously into the water to the south.

It is one of the possible locations for Cape Charax, near which the Arab pirates landed in the 820s and began their conquest of the island.

Landforms of Crete
Lithinon
Landforms of Heraklion (regional unit)